This is a list of British fencible regiments. The fencibles (from the word ) were British Army regiments raised in Great Britain and in the colonies for defence against the threat of invasion during the Seven Years' War, the American War of Independence and French Revolutionary Wars in the late 18th century. Usually temporary units, composed of local volunteers, commanded by Regular Army officers, their role was, as their name suggests, usually confined to garrison and patrol duties, freeing up the regular Army units to perform offensive operations.

The article is broken into two periods the first list is for the fencible regiments raised during the Seven Years' War and the American War of Independence the first was raised in 1759 two years after the start of the Seven Years' War and the last was disbanded in 1783 when active hostilities with the America colonies ended and the British recognised the de facto existence of the United States of America to be formalised by the Peace of Paris (1783).

There is a far larger list for the French Revolutionary Wars and the Irish Rebellion of 1798. The regiments were raised during a time of great turbulence in Europe when there was a real fear that the French would either invade Great Britain or Ireland, or that radicals within Britain and Ireland would rebel against the established order. There was little to do in Britain other than garrison duties, escorting and guarding prisoners as happened at Edinburgh Castle and some police actions.
In Ireland there was a French supported insurrection in 1798 and British fencible regiments were engaged in some minor pitched battles. Some regiments served outside Great Britain and Ireland. Several regiments performed garrison duties on the Channel Islands and Gibraltar. A detachment of the Dumbarton Fencible Regiment escorted prisoners to Prussia, and the Ancient Irish Fencibles were sent to Egypt where they took part in the operations against the French in 1801.

When it became clear that the rebellion in Ireland had been defeated and that there would be peace between France and Britain in 1802 (The preliminaries of peace were signed in London on 1 October 1801) the Fencible regiments were disbanded. The final ratification of the Peace of Amiens was concluded in March 1802. When hostilities were renewed with France during the Napoleonic Wars the British used alternative methods to defend the Home Nations (see for example the Additional Forces Act, July 1803) and with the exception of the Royal Manx Fencibles (third corps, 1803–1811) no more fencible regiments were raised for home defence.

Several fencible regiments were raised in the early 1800s in Britain for the defence of Canada, some of these saw active service during the Anglo-American War of 1812 (see the section (Further information).

List of fencible infantry regiments raised prior to 1793

The total number of British fencible infantry regiments raised during the Seven Years' War and the American War of Independence was nine, of which six were Scottish, two were English and one was Manx.

List of fencible cavalry regiments raised between 1793 and 1803
The British cavalry and light dragoon regiments were raised to serve in any part of Great Britain and consisted of a force of between 14,000 and 15,000 men. Along with the two Irish regiments, those British regiments that volunteered for service in Ireland served there. Each regiment consisted of eighteen commissioned officers and troops of eighty privates per troop. The regiments were always fully manned as their terms of service were considered favourable. The reduction of Fencible Cavalry was announced to take place on the 25th March, 1800. Early in 1800 all of the regiments were disbanded.

List of fencible infantry regiments raised between 1793 and 1803

Scottish fencibles

The Scottish Fencibles raised in 1793 had eight companies each, except the Orkney, which had three.

Those raised in 1794–1802 had ten companies, except the 1st Battalion Rothesay and Caithness Regiment, which had eight, and three others — the Angus Volunteers, Ross-shire and Shetland Fencibles — which had only two companies.

Of the total number of Scottish corps raised from 1739 to 1802, independent of Colonel Macneil's Argyll, Colonel Robertson's Perthshire (both having very few Highlanders), and the Ross-shire Fencibles (which are not included, as their number was small), the total number of Fencibles raised in the Highlands, and considered as exclusively Highland, amounted to twenty-six battalions Some of the other Scottish Fencibles, however, although not nominally Highland, had a number of men from the Highlands in their ranks, and this fact is noted in the above list under the regiments concerned.

English fencibles

Irish fencibles

Welsh fencibles

Manx fencibles

Further information
Three other Fencible Corps may have been raised between 1795–1798, which were disbanded in 1801–2 viz.:
Royal Birmingham or Rann's Fencibles
Nova Scotia Provincial Regiment (for service in Canada), 1803–1816: Newfoundland, Nova Scotia, Quebec, Ontario.
Prince Edward's Island Fencibles (for service in Canada)

In 1803 four Fencible Corps were raised for service in Canada. They were:
Royal Newfoundland,  or Skerret's Fencibles, 1803–1816: Newfoundland, Nova Scotia, Quebec, Ontario. located at St.Johns in 1804. raised in Newfoundland.
New Brunswick, or Hunter's Fencibles, raised in 1803, numbered 104th in 1810, New Brunswick. Listed as a corps at New Brunswick in 1804.
Nova Scotia,  or Wetherall's Fencibles Located in Halifax, Nova Scotia in 1804. In January 1804 Lieut-Colonel John A. Vesey, from 52nd was appointed to be Lieutenant-Colonel, vice Roberts, deceased. Lieut-Col John Taylor succeeded Lieutenant-Col Anderson in 1806.
Canadian Fencible Infantry, or Peter's Fencibles
They were all disbanded in 1816.

Besides the established regiments there were seven regiments (each of one battalion) for which Letters of Service were issued, but which never appear to have been formed. Five were to have been raised in Scotland and two in England, with a strength of ten companies each:

The total number of fencible infantry corps embodied 1793–1802 was thus 61 battalions of which 29 were Scottish, 15 were English, 4 Irish, 1 Welsh and 2 Manx. "Most of the Fencible Corps," writes Sir John Fortescue "were created either in 1794 or 1798, and to judge by the old Monthly Army Lists of 1799, the greatest number of them in existence at one time in Great Britain was 31 regiments of cavalry and 45 battalions of infantry. But by March 1800 the greater part of the cavalry had been disembodied, so that it would not be wise to reckon the Fencibles as exceeding, at their highest figure, twenty to twenty-five thousand men".

The preliminaries of peace were signed in London on 1 October 1801. The final ratification of the Peace of Amiens, however, was not concluded until March 1802. Fortescue writes "most, if not all, of the fencible infantry were disbanded in May 1801, before the signature of the preliminaries of peace", but Ian Scobie states that this was not so, as the greater number were not disbanded until late in 1801 or early in 1802, and that many of the Scottish fencibles, were not disbanded until some time after the Peace of Amiens had been signed (as will be seen from the preceding lists).

The disbandment of the fencibles in 1802, and "the establishment in that year of a permanent Scots Militia, rendered unnecessary any further organisation on a large scale of this more ancient but partial system of national defence".

See also
Sea Fencibles
List of British Commands and Army groups

Notes

References

.

Attribution:
 endnotes:

Further reading

 
Military units and formations of the British Army